The 2015 Lakeside World Professional Darts Championship was the 38th World Championship organised by the British Darts Organisation, and the 30th staging at the Lakeside Country Club at Frimley Green. 2014 BDO champion Stephen Bunting did not defend his title, as he switched to the rival PDC organisation at the start of the season. Scott Mitchell beat Martin Adams 7–6 in the final for his first world title.

For the first time since 1992 no player from the Netherlands reached the last 16.

Format and qualifiers

Men's

Women's
The televised stages feature 16 players. The top 8 players in the BDO rankings over the 2013/14 season are seeded for the tournament.

Top 8
  Deta Hedman (first round)
  Anastasia Dobromyslova (semi-final)
  Aileen de Graaf (quarter-finals)
  Lorraine Winstanley (first round)
  Rachel Brooks (quarter-finals)
  Fallon Sherrock (runner-up)
  Zoe Jones (quarter-finals)
  Trina Gulliver (quarter-finals)

Other qualifiers
  Lisa Ashton (winner)
  Sharon Prins (semi-final)
  Irina Armstrong (first round)
  Casey Gallagher (first round)
  Anneke Kuijten (first round)
  Paula Jacklin (first round)

Hull qualifiers
  Maria Mason (first round)
  Sarah Brent (first round)

Youth
For the first time a youth tournament was played. The final stages at Lakeside though just consisted of a best of five sets final between Harry Ward and Colin Roelofs. Over 64 players have played down to the final in October 2014. Roelofs won the title, 3-0 in sets.

Prize money
The total prize money was £339,000. Additionally there was a £52,000 prize for a nine dart finish.

Representation from different countries
This table shows the number of players in the Men's World Championship, the total number including Preliminary round.

* In darts, as in many other sports, some non-sovereign sub-national entities of the United Kingdom are treated as separate countries for sport governance purposes.

Draw
The draw was held on 12 October 2014.

Men

Preliminary round
To be played from 3–5 January. All matches are the best of 5 sets.

Last 32

Women
In a repeat of last year's final Lisa Ashton beat Deta Hedman in the first round. She defended her title by winning the final 3-1 over Fallon Sherrock and became the tournament's oldest winner with 44 years of age. Also in the final, Fallon Sherrock set a competition record by throwing six 180s in a match and 13 180s in the tournament.

Media coverage
Following exclusive coverage on the BBC in 2014, BBC & BT Sport will share broadcasting duties of the 2015 edition for the first time ever. The BBC had previously shared coverage of the tournament with ESPN from 2012 to 2013. The BBC have exclusive live coverage of every afternoon session, the first men's semi final and the women's final, while BT have exclusive coverage of every evening session and the second men's semi final, with both broadcasters sharing coverage of the final. In addition, the BBC will broadcast late night highlights.

The BBC live coverage will be hosted by Colin Murray alongside Bobby George; Rob Walker will be the roving reporter and also host the late night highlights show. Ray Stubbs will return to the Lakeside to host for BT Sport, having previously hosted BBC coverage between 2001–2009 and ESPN coverage between 2012–2013, with Ted Hankey alongside him, while Helen Skelton has been confirmed as the BT Sport roving reporter. Commentary will be provided by Tony Green, Vassos Alexander, John Rawling, Jim Proudfoot and George Riley.

References

External links
Schedule of matches at lakesideworlddarts.co.uk
BDOdarts.com
BBC.com

BDO World Darts Championships
BDO World Darts Championship
BDO World Darts Championship
BDO World Darts Championship
Sport in Surrey
Frimley Green